Évreux Portes de Normandie is the communauté d'agglomération, an intercommunal structure, centred on the city of Évreux. It is located in the Eure department, in the Normandy region, northern France. It was created on 1 January 2017 by the merger of the former Communauté d'agglomération d'Évreux and the Communauté de communes La porte normande. On 1 January 2018 it was expanded with 12 communes from three other intercommunalities. Its area is 659.3 km2. Its population was 110,023 in 2015, of which 46,707 in Évreux proper.

Composition
The communauté d'agglomération consists of the following 74 communes:

Acon
Angerville-la-Campagne
Arnières-sur-Iton
Les Authieux
Aviron
La Baronnie
Les Baux-Sainte-Croix
Bois-le-Roi
Boncourt
Le Boulay-Morin
Bretagnolles
Caugé
Champigny-la-Futelaye
La Chapelle-du-Bois-des-Faulx
Chavigny-Bailleul
Cierrey
Coudres
Courdemanche
La Couture-Boussey
Croth
Dardez
Droisy
Émalleville
Épieds
Évreux
Fauville
Fontaine-sous-Jouy
La Forêt-du-Parc
Foucrainville
Fresney
Garennes-sur-Eure
Gauciel
Gauville-la-Campagne
Gravigny
Grossœuvre
Guichainville
L'Habit
Huest
Illiers-l'Évêque
Irreville
Jouy-sur-Eure
Jumelles
Lignerolles
Marcilly-la-Campagne
Marcilly-sur-Eure
Le Mesnil-Fuguet
Mesnil-sur-l'Estrée
Miserey
Moisville
Mouettes
Mousseaux-Neuville
Muzy
Normanville
Parville
Le Plessis-Grohan
Prey
Reuilly
Sacquenville
Saint-André-de-l'Eure
Saint-Germain-de-Fresney
Saint-Germain-des-Angles
Saint-Germain-sur-Avre
Saint-Laurent-des-Bois
Saint-Luc
Saint-Martin-la-Campagne
Saint-Sébastien-de-Morsent
Saint-Vigor
Sassey
Serez
Tourneville
La Trinité
Le Val-David
Les Ventes
Le Vieil-Évreux

See also
 Agglomeration communities in France

References

Agglomeration communities in France
Intercommunalities of Eure
Évreux